Mahesh Raut is an activist working with Adivasi in Gadchiroli. He is the youngest accused in the 2018 Bhima Koregaon violence case.

Personal life 
Raut was born in Lakhapur village in Chandrapur district of Maharashtra's Vidarbha region. He did his schooling from Navodaya school in Gadchiroli. He briefly worked as a primary teacher around 2007. In 2009, he joined TISS, Mumbai to study social work. After completing his degree from TISS, Raut was selected for the Prime Minister Rural Development (PMRD) fellowship. In 2018, he suffered from acute ulcerative colitis.

Activism 
Raut is a co-convener of the Visthapan Virodhi Jan Vilas Andolan (VVJVA), which fights the displacement of marginalised communities. Under the VVJVA, he has campaigned along with Adivasi communities of the region to sell Tendu leaves directly into the market without the involvement of the middlemen. He is also a member of the Bharat Jan Andolan, a human rights NGO. He has campaigned against mining projects in Gadhciroli, including the Surajgarh mining project. He has also campaigned against caste discrimination.

Arrest 
On 6 June 2018, he was arrested from his house by the Pune Police, under the Unlawful Activities (Prevention) Act. He is currently lodged at Taloja central jail.

References 

Living people
Indian civil rights activists
Year of birth missing (living people)
People from Chandrapur district
Indian social workers
Indian prisoners and detainees